Truth & Soul  is the fifth studio album by Australian-New Zealand recording artist Stan Walker. It was released in Australia and New Zealand on 17 April 2015 by Sony Music Australia and features a collection of soul covers.

Background
Whilst working as a judge on The X Factor New Zealand and on a new album of original material, Walker decided to "buy some time" and release an album of soul covers.
The idea of recording an album of covers was suggested to Walker by the head of Sony Australia, Denis Handlin, and Walker initially rejected the idea, having previously stated on the subject: "Hell no! I'm an artist! I write my stuff!" However, he began going through his Facebook and saw the videos he had put up of the covers that inspired him. He later was adamant that he interpret the songs his own way. The album was announced in March. Walker said, "These are songs I've loved forever and songs I've fallen in love with all over again. They've always been with me and I wanted to make them my own."

"To be honest, this record is a little bit of self-indulgence because they are my favourite songs. And I would have been scared to sing any of them out of the shower three years ago, especially 'Let's Get it On', because of who I was and what I represented as a young man," Walker said. "I have a standard to uphold — my whole thing as an artist has been that I don't sell sex. Now I feel I have become more honest about who I am and I actually don't care what people think. I want to sing and talk about sex and love and dreams and death and these songs let me do it. I want to feel good, like anyone."

Promotion
Walker performed "Signed, Sealed, Delivered I'm Yours" and "A Change Is Gonna Come" for Radio New Zealand on April 16. He later sung "I Got a Woman" and "Endless Love" with Dami Im on April 17 on Sunrise.

Walker performed a medley of songs from the album live on The X Factor New Zealand on April 20. He later performed "Is This Love" on the Today on May 8.

Critical reception
Victoria Venardos of Renowned for Sound said: "Stan's vocal ability is impressively on display throughout this record, you can hear a deep respect for each song with effortless falsetto and unveiled emotion."

Andja Curcic also of Renowned for Sound gave the album 3.5 stars out of 5 in his review of the album, saying: "Overall, Truth & Soul showcases a playful approach to musical covers and that is something Walker should be commended for. However, there is also a danger when transforming iconic hits – their beauty can be lost. Walker's vocals shine in this album and it is nice to see him steer away from the pop scene and reconnect with his roots. This album is a solid effort."

Siena Yates of Stuff.co.nz said; "It's a good listen, and Walker's vocals are impressive as ever, but there's not a lot of improving on classics like these." Yates complimented "A Change Is Gonna Come", calling it the standout "on which Walker is soulful, thoughtful and appropriately restrained, letting Sam Cooke's classic resonate on its own, without letting it override his vocal."

Track listing

Charts
The album becomes Walker's third top 10 album in Australia after his debut Introducing Stan Walker in 2009 and From the Inside Out in 2010.

Weekly charts

Year-end charts

Release history

References

2015 albums
Covers albums
Stan Walker albums
Sony Music Australia albums